Power Drive is a racing video game in which the player competes in rally driving in various countries. It was developed by Rage Software and published by U.S. Gold in 1994. The Genesis version (in North America only) was released exclusively on the Sega Channel.

Reception

In 1995, Total! rated Power Drive 100th on their "Top 100 SNES Games" saying that Power Drive is highly addictive.

References

External links
Power Drive at Mobygames

1994 video games
Amiga games
Amiga CD32 games
DOS games
Windows games
Racing video games
Game Gear games
Sega Genesis games
Super Nintendo Entertainment System games
U.S. Gold games
Rage Games games
Multiplayer and single-player video games
Video games developed in the United Kingdom